Jose Angelo "Sheldon" Chua Gellada is the bassist of the band, Hale.

Discography

As a bassist of Hale
2005 – Hale
2006 – Twilight
2008 – Above, Over And Beyond
2009 – Kundiman
2015 – Time and Space
2018 – Alon

As a guest accompaniment
2011 – Synergy – Performed Bass on Track Number 7

 For a full, detailed list, see: Hale discography

References

1984 births
Living people
Musicians from Metro Manila
Filipino bass guitarists
21st-century bass guitarists